is a 2012 Japanese film directed and written by Tetsu Maeda. It centers on a teenager having the IQ of a 6-year-old and his childhood friend, who tries to get him to fit into the society. The film is based on the manga with same name by Yamada Naito.

Plot 
The story involves of three boys. They were all friends since they were little. One day, something which changed their entire life had happened. One of the boys called Morio, a six-year-old boy, fell from the swing when they were playing. He remained unconscious for about 12 years in a hospital. Morio’s friends and family tried to escape from the tragedy and forget about this accident. The other  two boys, Mikihiko and Tomonari, had grown up and nearly forgot about Morio. Finally, Morio woke up and regained consciousness suddenly. However, Morio’s intelligence quotient stayed at 6 years old. Mikihiko decided to help Morio to catch up with the society. Therefore, Mikihiko had to sacrifice a lot of things in order to spend time and look after Morio, for instance, he broke up with his girlfriend Kie, quitted university and his free time etc. Nevertheless, Mikihiko failed to let Morio became accustomed to the society because Morio still had a childish and naive heart. Morio came back to the hospital and Mikihiko continued to live his own life at the end. Eventually, Mikihiko realised that everyone, even the ones who are childish as Morio could not escape from the reality of growing up and has to  face the world which was ugly as sin.

Cast 
Masaki Suda as Morio
Tori Matsuzaka as Mikihiko
Fumi Nikaido as Kie
Hiroki Aiba as Tomonari
Masataka Nakagauchi as Jun
Miyuki Matsuda as Keiko Mitsui

Manga 
The film is adapted into a Japanese manga of the same name, created by Yamada Naito, who writes in both Japan and France. The manga was first published in 1992 in Weekly Young Sunday (Shogakukan) and reissued in 1997 and was announced to be released in the form of movie in September 2012.

Theme 
“After being hurt and getting lost, we become adults.”, wrote on the film's promotional poster. The film talks about various difficulties  each teenager faces when they are about to turn to an adult. It focuses on the emotional struggles of teenage life.

It is believed that each teenager has a period of time which they experience the feeling of confusion and reluctance to be a grown up. They refuse to become an adult because they know being an adult is different. Like those young friends of Morio in the film, they refused to make friends with Mikihiko, since he’s an adult. They regard adults as devils and are not willing to let Morio go with Mikihiko when they are having party.

This is a struggle occurs inside every person's heart. They do not understand an adult's way of life which is always fully scheduled with work and social life, but not genuine fun and innocent games. They try their best to fight with the changes when they grow  up. But it is hard because sometimes life would leave you no choice but to follow the mainstream. Even though you are not willing to, one day you will find yourself engaged in the adult's life, like Morio in the film.

Also, it is awkward for Mikihiko to try his best to make contact with Morio after he woke up. This implies that the grown-ups are often eager to search for the innocence once they had but the fact is they always fail to do so as they have lost in the huge wheel of adults’affairs.

Soundtrack 
The theme song is "ours~ Our Footprints" (『ours～ボクらの足跡～』 ) by Good Coming.

References

External links 
 Manga News
 JFDB The Boy Inside
 The official website (in Japanese)
 

2010s Japanese-language films
2012 films
Japanese independent films